Dilaver Satılmış (born 24 February 1979 in Basel) is a former football player. Born in Switzerland, he represented Turkey at under-21 international level.

Satılmış played youth football with FC Basel. He played for Trabzonspor and Diyarbakirspor in the Turkish Super Lig, and after spells back the in Swiss leagues, later played for SV Darmstadt 98 and SV Wacker Burghausen in Germany.

References

External links
 

1979 births
Living people
Swiss people of Turkish descent
Footballers from Basel
Turkish footballers
Swiss men's footballers
Association football fullbacks
Turkey under-21 international footballers
Turkey youth international footballers
SV Wacker Burghausen players
Trabzonspor footballers
Diyarbakırspor footballers
Antalyaspor footballers
FC Basel players
FC Luzern players
FC Wil players
SR Delémont players
SV Darmstadt 98 players
Süper Lig players
Swiss Super League players
2. Bundesliga players
3. Liga players
Turkish expatriate footballers
Swiss expatriate footballers
Expatriate footballers in Germany
Turkish expatriate sportspeople in Germany
Swiss expatriate sportspeople in Germany